Faces are an English rock band formed in 1969 by members of Small Faces after lead singer and guitarist Steve Marriott left to form Humble Pie. The remaining Small Faces—Ian McLagan (keyboards), Ronnie Lane (electric bass, vocals), and Kenney Jones (drums and percussion)—were joined by guitarist Ronnie Wood and singer Rod Stewart, both from the Jeff Beck Group, and the new line-up was renamed Faces.

The band had a unique arrangement, as Rod Stewart had signed a separate solo recording contract with the Mercury label shortly before joining the group, which was signed to Warner's.  Band members often contributed to Stewart's solo albums as contract players, and Faces live shows of the period would feature as much of Stewart's solo material as that of the band, which later fuelled tensions amongst them when they began to effectively be viewed as Stewart's 'backing band'. The group lacked a single main songwriter as from the beginning each member would work in tandem to offer songs for each of their albums (Stewart and Wood most often wrote together as a duo, as did Lane and Wood, while Lane would usually contribute at least one solo composition per album).  While Stewart was the primary lead singer, both Lane and Wood would also sing lead vocals on several tracks (Lane usually sang lead on his own solo compositions).   Their first two albums, First Step (1970) and Long Player (1971), lacked a hit single, but their third album, 1971's A Nod Is As Good As a Wink... to a Blind Horse, bolstered by the success of Stewart's solo work, became a worldwide hit, peaking at number 2 on the UK Albums Chart and number 6 on the U.S. Billboard 200 album chart and spawning the band's first hit single, "Stay with Me".

Tensions in the band came to a head during the recording of their fourth (and final) studio album, 1973's Ooh La La.  Ronnie Lane, who was a founder member of Small Faces, left over his diminished role in the band in 1973, and was replaced by Tetsu Yamauchi on bass.  The band continued to tour throughout 1974 and 1975, releasing a live album, Coast to Coast: Overture and Beginners, in 1974 that was jointly credited to Rod Stewart/Faces.  Ronnie Wood also began to drift from the group over this period, releasing two solo albums of his own, and appearing as a guest musician on two Rolling Stones albums and joining them on tour in 1975.  He was briefly replaced by Jesse Ed Davis on guitars before the band broke up at the end of 1975.

A greatest hits collection, Snakes and Ladders / The Best of Faces, appeared in 1976, and additional retrospective albums would appear over the subsequent decades.  Stewart would continue his successful solo career, while Ronnie Wood would formally join the Rolling Stones as a permanent member in 1975. Kenney Jones joined the Who as a replacement for the deceased Keith Moon in 1978.  Ian McLagan would go on to work as a session and touring musician with a number of acts (including his own bands) throughout the 1970s until his death in 2014, while Ronnie Lane's activities in the music business (which included 1977's critically-lauded Rough Mix collaboration with Pete Townshend) were severely curtailed by 1980 due to the onset of multiple sclerosis which forced his eventual retirement by the early 1990s. 

The original Small Faces would have a reunion during the mid to late 1970s with Marriott, Jones, and McLagan joined by Rick Wills on bass guitar, as Lane withdrew early due to his illness. A number of partial reunions of the Faces were rumoured throughout the 2000s, with various one-off performances involving surviving members occurring.  In 2010-2011 a brief reunion tour occurred with Mick Hucknall and Glen Matlock on vocals and bass respectively. In 2021, Jones, Stewart, and Wood reunited to record a new record.

Faces and Small Faces were jointly inducted into the Rock and Roll Hall of Fame in 2012. Stewart was scheduled to perform with the rest of the band, but was unable to do so at the last minute due to illness; he was replaced by Hucknall.

History
The first collaboration among the future Faces was in a formation called Quiet Melon, which also featured Wood's older brother Art Wood and Kim Gardner; they recorded four songs and played a few shows in May 1969, during a break in Ronnie Wood's and Rod Stewart's commitments with The Jeff Beck Group. Later that summer Wood and Stewart parted ways with Beck and joined Lane, McLagan and Jones full-time. Prior to any releases by the new Faces line-up, Wood and McLagan appeared on Stewart's first solo album in 1969, An Old Raincoat Won't Ever Let You Down (known as The Rod Stewart Album in the US). The rest of the backing band on the album included drummer Micky Waller, keyboardist Keith Emerson and guitarists Martin Pugh (of Steamhammer, and later Armageddon and 7th Order) and Martin Quittenton (also from Steamhammer).

With the addition of Wood and Stewart, the "small" part of the original band name was dropped, partly because the two newcomers (at 5'9" and 5'10" respectively) were significantly taller than the three former Small Faces. Hoping to capitalise on the Small Faces' earlier success, record company executives wanted the band to keep their old name; however, the band objected, arguing the personnel changes resulted in a group very different from the Small Faces. As a compromise, in the US their debut album was credited to the Small Faces, while subsequent albums appeared under their new name.

The group regularly toured Britain, Europe and the United States from 1970 to 1975, and were among the top-grossing live acts in that period; in 1974 their touring also encompassed Australia, New Zealand and Japan. They toured the United States and Canada in 1975. Among their most successful songs were "Had Me a Real Good Time", their breakthrough UK hit "Stay with Me", "Cindy Incidentally" and "Pool Hall Richard". As Rod Stewart's solo career became more successful than that of the group, the band became overshadowed by their lead singer. A disillusioned Ronnie Lane left the band in 1973; one reason given later for his departure was frustration over not having more opportunities to sing lead vocals.

Lane's role as bassist was taken over by Tetsu Yamauchi (who had replaced Andy Fraser in Free). Released just months before Lane left the band, the Faces' final studio album was Ooh La La.

The following year a live album was released, entitled Coast to Coast: Overture and Beginners; it was criticised by reviewers for being poorly recorded and thought out. It featured selections from their late 1973 tour, the first featuring Yamauchi. They recorded a few tracks for another studio album, but had lost enthusiasm and their final release as a group was the late 1974 UK Top 20 hit "You Can Make Me Dance, Sing or Anything". In 1975 Wood began working with the Rolling Stones, which brought differences between Stewart and the others to a head, and after a troubled fall US tour (with Jesse Ed Davis on rhythm guitar), in December the band announced that they were splitting.

Post-Faces
The members have had varied post-band careers. Wood joined the Rolling Stones and later became a full member with the departure of Mick Taylor, Lane formed Slim Chance and had a modest solo career that ended prematurely when he was diagnosed with multiple sclerosis and he also worked on an album with Who guitarist Pete Townshend, Rough Mix. Jones joined the Who after the death of Keith Moon; McLagan stated in a 2004 interview that Townshend also asked him to join the Who, but he had already promised Keith Richards that he would tour as a Rolling Stones sideman. McLagan moved to the United States, where he formed Ian McLagan & the Bump Band. Tetsu Yamauchi returned to his native Japan, where he recorded and toured as a jazz musician and Stewart's solo career was extremely successful. There was also a Small Faces reunion in the late 1970s (without Ronnie Lane) that resulted in two albums; and in 1981 Ronnie Lane and Steve Marriott collaborated on the album The Legendary Majik Mijits.

Faces reformed for the encore of Rod Stewart's Wembley Stadium concert in 1986. Ronnie Lane, by then suffering from multiple sclerosis, was on stage to sing in his wheelchair, but was unable to play bass; Bill Wyman of the Rolling Stones filled in for him. The same line-up reunited once more (minus Lane) in 1993 when Rod Stewart was awarded the Lifetime Achievement award at the Brit Awards. Ronnie Lane made his final concert appearance in 1992 at a Ronnie Wood show with Ian McLagan on keyboards; Lane died in 1997.

In 2004 a 4-disc Faces box set entitled Five Guys Walk into a Bar... was released by Rhino Records, featuring many of the band's most popular tracks as well as several previously unreleased songs. Drummer Kenney Jones formed a group called the Jones Gang, together with singer Robert Hart (formerly of Bad Company), Patrick Walford and bassist Rick Wills (formerly of Foreigner); in 2005 their first single "Angel" reached number 1 on the US Billboard "hot singles sales" list.

During 2004 and early 2005 the surviving Faces had several near-reunions, none of which featured more than three members at the same time: In May 2004 Kenney Jones and Ronnie Wood joined Ian McLagan on stage at his concert at The Mean Fiddler in London. In August 2004 Wood and McLagan joined Stewart at the Hollywood Bowl; Wood also appeared at several other of Stewart's 2004 gigs, including New York's Madison Square Garden, the Royal Albert Hall and a street performance in London for an audience of 80,000. In March 2005 McLagan joined Ronnie Wood's band at a London show, which also featured Kenney Jones on drums for the final encore; and in December 2005 Wood joined Ian McLagan & the Bump Band for three numbers at a concert in Houston, Texas.

Reunion

On 11 June 2008, Rod Stewart announced that the surviving Faces were discussing a possible reunion, envisioning making a recording and/or performing at least one or two concerts. On 18 November Rod Stewart, Ron Wood, Ian McLagan and Kenney Jones reunited along with Rod Stewart's touring bassist Conrad Korsch for a rehearsal "just to check if they can remember the songs"; the band's official reunion website was launched earlier the same month. However, on 23 January 2009, a spokesman for Rod Stewart denied there were any plans for a 2009 Faces reunion tour.

On 24 September 2009, it was announced that the Faces, minus Rod Stewart, would reunite for a one-off charity show for the Performing Rights Society's Music Members' Benevolent Fund, at the Royal Albert Hall in London. "This will be so special for us, staging a reunion for such a wonderful and prestigious event," said Ronnie Wood when the announcement of the concert was made. "Sadly Ronnie Lane can't be with us, but I'm sure he will be there in spirit, God bless him." Lane's ex-wife, Katy, is one of many to receive assistance from the charity. The event was held on 25 October. Ronnie Wood, Kenney Jones and Ian McLagan all took part, with various vocalists, including Mick Hucknall, replacing Stewart, and Bill Wyman filling in for the late Ronnie Lane on bass guitar.

On 25 May 2010, it was announced that the Faces had officially reformed with Hucknall taking on vocal duties, and Glen Matlock of the Sex Pistols on bass. The band played festival dates in both 2010 and 2011, with dates in the UK, Belgium, the Netherlands and Japan.

The Small Faces/Faces were inducted into the Rock and Roll Hall of Fame in 2012. On 23 March, the Faces announced that they would reunite with Rod Stewart to play at the induction ceremony for the first time in 19 years. However, on the eve of the ceremony, Stewart bowed out owing to a bout of influenza and Hucknall was asked to sing in his place. In June 2013, speaking in an interview on YouTube, Kenney Jones confirmed the band's intention to reunite with Stewart for a tour in 2014. However, Ian McLagan died on 3 December 2014, putting this reunion in doubt.

Rod Stewart, Ronnie Wood and Kenney Jones performed a short set at Hurtwood Polo Club on 5 September 2015 for charity, following their brief reunion at Rod Stewart's private party for his 70th birthday in January of that year. The reunion show was critically acclaimed, with The Telegraph newspaper reviewing the performance as "5 star," under the headline of "worth the 40-year wait."

A further reunion occurred in 2019 at a Private event. In 2020 Rod Stewart reunited with Ronnie Wood and Kenney Jones to perform "Stay With Me" as the finale of that years Brit Awards Ceremony.

On July 19, 2021, it was reported that Kenney Jones, Rod Stewart and Ron Wood had reunited in the studio to record new music.

Influence on music
Although they enjoyed only modest success compared to contemporaries such as the Who and the Rolling Stones, the Faces have had considerable influence on latter-day rock revivalists. Their good-natured, back-to-basics (and frequently liquor-laden) concerts and studio albums connect them with such bands as the Damned and the Sex Pistols.

They were inducted into the Rock and Roll Hall of Fame in 2012.

Personnel

Current and former members 
Kenney Jones – drums, percussion (1969–1975, 1986, 1993, 2009–2012, 2015, 2019, 2020, 2021-present)
Ronnie Wood – guitar, vocals, bass (1969–1975, 1986, 1993, 2009–2012, 2015, 2019, 2020, 2021-present)
Rod Stewart – lead vocals, harmonica, occasional banjo and guitar (1969–1975, 1986, 1993, 2015, 2019, 2020, 2021-present)
Ian McLagan – keyboards, backing vocals (1969–1975, 1986, 1993, 2009–2012; died 2014)
Ronnie Lane – bass, vocals, guitar (1969–1973; died 1997)
Tetsu Yamauchi – bass (1973–1975)

Additional personnel 
Jesse Ed Davis – rhythm guitar (1975; died 1988)
Bill Wyman – bass (1986, 1993, 2009)
Andy Fairweather Low – rhythm guitar (2009)
Mick Hucknall – lead vocals (2009–2012)
Glen Matlock – bass (2010–2012)
Robin Le Mesurier - guitar (2015; died 2021)

Timeline of members

Discography

Studio albums 
 First Step (1970)
 Long Player (1971)
 A Nod Is As Good As a Wink... to a Blind Horse (1971)
 Ooh La La (1973)

References

External links

 

English blues rock musical groups
Rod Stewart
British supergroups
Rock music supergroups
Musical groups established in 1969
Musical groups disestablished in 1975
Musical groups reestablished in 2009
Musical groups disestablished in 2011
Musical groups reestablished in 2021
Musical groups from London
Musical quintets
Mercury Records artists
Warner Records artists
1969 establishments in England